Enginuity is an interactive design and technology centre in Coalbrookdale, Shropshire, England.  It is the newest of the ten museums operated by the Ironbridge Gorge Museum Trust and was opened in 2002.  The museum's exhibition floor is divided into four zones: Materials & Structures, Systems & Control, Energy and Design.  Enginuity also offers workshops and interactive shows for school groups.  During school holidays, the interactive shows are offered to the general public on varying themes.

Zones 

Materials & Structures
Systems & Control
Energy
Design
FABLAB

Workshops 

Workshops can be run for school groups or even as corporate events.  The currently available workshops are:

Shows 
Materials
Forces
Electricity

References 

Tourism board web page

External links 

Enginuity

Coalbrookdale
Tourist attractions in Shropshire
Museums in Shropshire
Science museums in England
Ironbridge Gorge Museum Trust
Technology museums in the United Kingdom